National Road 1.9 (alternatively marked as M-1.9, M1.9 and M 1.9), was a road in Serbia, connecting Belgrade with Romania at Vatin. After the new road categorization regulation given in 2013, the route wears the name 10, except for the section passing through the capital city, which is currently not numbered. The route was a national road with two traffic lanes (more in city sections).

Sections

See also 
 Roads in Serbia

References

External links 
 Official website – Roads of Serbia (Putevi Srbije)
 Official website – Corridors of Serbia (Koridori Srbije) (Serbian)

Roads in Serbia